State Route 183 (SR 183) is a state highway in the U.S. state of Maine. It runs from U.S. Route 1 (US 1) to Schoodic Beach Road entirely within the town of Sullivan, Hancock County.

Route description
SR 183 begins at US 1 within the community of East Sullivan. The route, known as Tunk Lake Road for its entire length, heads northeast through a mostly forested area with numerous houses lining the road. It makes a turn to the east at an unpaved fire road but eventually curves back to the northeast. It intersects Flanders Pond Road which provides access to the water body of the same name. Before ending, SR 183 crosses the Down East Sunrise Trail, formerly a railroad line, within the community of Tunk Lake. The highway ends at Schoodic Beach Road which heads to the west and Tunk Lake Road continues north as a locally-maintained road to Tunk Lake.

Junction list

References

External links

Floodgap Roadgap's RoadsAroundME: Maine State Route 183

183
Transportation in Hancock County, Maine